Philly is an American legal drama television series created by Steven Bochco and Alison Cross, which starred Kim Delaney as defense attorney Kathleen Maguire. The series aired on ABC from September 25, 2001 to May 28, 2002, broadcasting 22 episodes before it was canceled due to low ratings.

Overview
Kathleen Maguire is a single mother and partner in a small Philadelphia law firm with Will Froman (Tom Everett Scott).  She fights to get her clients out of trouble and deals with professional conflicts arising from her relationship with her ex-husband Dan Cavanaugh (Kyle Secor), the Deputy for Trials. She also starts to date Judge Augustus "Jack" Ripley (James Denton).

Cast
 Kim Delaney as Kathleen Maguire, a frank, driven attorney and single mother forced to take on her firm after only a year of practice after her partner has a mental breakdown in court.
 Tom Everett Scott as Will Froman, Kathleen's womanizing law partner
 Rick Hoffman as Terry Loomis, an ADA whom Kathleen regularly goes up against, and whom she has formed a frenemy relationship with.
 Diana-Maria Riva as Trish, Kathleen's secretary
 Scotty Leavenworth as Patrick Cavanaugh, Kathleen's young son.
 Kyle Secor as Daniel Cavanaugh, Kathleen's ex-husband, a deputy who is bitter about her leaving him.

Recurring
 Robert Harper as Judge Irwin Hawes, a slimy, abrasive judge who has frequent run-ins with Kathleen.
 Dena Dietrich as Judge Ellen Armstrong
 James Denton as Judge Augustus "Jack" Ripley, a judge who Kathleen becomes romantically involved with.
 Kristanna Loken as Lisa Walensky, an ADA who has an on-again, off-again relationship with Will.
 Veronica Hamel as Judge Marjorie Brennan, the mistress of Will's father, whom Will himself gets involved with.
 Monique Edwards as ADA Teena Davis
 Anne Gee Byrd as Annie Maguire

Notable Guest Stars
 Joanna Cassidy as Marian Marshall, Kathleen's law partner, who she is forced to take over for after a mental breakdown in the middle of a trial.
 Pauley Perrette as Angela
 Dean Norris as Detective Duffy
 James Avery as Dean Mark Clivner
 Sharon Lawrence as Tabitha Davenport, a madam whose client list includes Judge Hawes. Lawrence had previously co-starred with Delaney on NYPD Blue.
 Zachery Ty Bryan as Brian Lee
 Judd Hirsch as Rabbi Nathan Wexler
 Red Buttons as Murray Klopman

Episodes

Production
As Stephen Bochco had been developing a legal series, he was beginning to become weary of NYPD Blue. Feeling she was underutilized on the show, Bocho offered the lead role to cast member Delaney, who accepted. In March 2001, Scott and Hoffman were cast beside Delaney. ABC ordered the pilot to series in May, and Delaney officially departed NYPD Blue. Based on strong ratings, ABC ordered a full season in November. However, ratings declined over the season, and ABC officially canceled the series at its annual upfronts in May 2002.

Broadcast
The complete series has not been released on DVD by CBS DVD, but is for purchase to stream by episode or the entire season on Amazon Prime. The series briefly aired in syndication on Universal HD in 2008.

Reception
The series received mixed reviews from critics. Ken Tucker of Entertainment Weekly gave the series a grade of "C", stating that the show "is like biting into a cold, stale version of the city's famous cheese steak — it gives you a lot to chew on, but it's pretty greasy, gummy fare." Phil Gallo at Variety gave a lukewarm review of the series, positively reviewing Delaney, but noting the show "lacked a distinctive tone".

References

External links

 
 

2001 American television series debuts
2002 American television series endings
2000s American drama television series
2000s American legal television series
English-language television shows
Television series by CBS Studios
Television shows set in Philadelphia
Television series created by Steven Bochco